The 2011–12 season will be the 78th season in Real Club Deportivo Mallorca's history and their 15th consecutive season in La Liga, the top division of Spanish football.  It covers a period from 1 July 2011 to 30 June 2012.

Mallorca will compete for their first La Liga title after a 17th-place finish in the 2010–11 La Liga.  They will also enter the Copa del Rey in the Round of 32.

Players

Squad information
''The numbers are established according to the official website:www.rcdmallorca.es

Transfers

In

 

Total expenditure:  €0 million

Out

 
Total income:  €0 million

Club

Coaching staff

Competitions

La Liga

League table

Results summary

Results by round

Matches

Copa del Rey

See also

2011–12 Copa del Rey
2011–12 La Liga

Notes and references

External links
 

Mallorca
RCD Mallorca seasons